Namaiyur is a small village part of Kunnam Taluk, Perambalur, Tamil Nadu, India. The nearby places are Trichy and Ariyalur. Here nature of work is agriculture only.

Geography 

Economy

Currently, Namaiyur Village is the top Sugarcane, Tapioca, maize , turmeric, onions, etc.

Temples and Festivals 

Namaiyur has Some temples and places
In this temple the festival is a very most famous festival around this area, similar to the.
 Mariamman temple
 Vinayagar temple
 Sivan temple
 Perumal temple
 Selliamman temple
 Karuppusamy temple 
 Aakasa thurai temple 
 Kaattu Ayyanar temple 
 Periyandavar temple
 Oorsuthiyan temple
 Om shakthi temple

Agriculture and Major Crops

Rice and Sugar cane are grown as a major commercial crop. The predominant soil in the district is red sanding with scattered packers of black soil. This village consists mainly of glade soil. The soil in the district is best suited for raising dry crops. Cotton also grown in many places.
 Rice (vast tracts)
 Sugarcane(vast tracts)
 Tapioca(vast tracts)
 Corn
 Cotton (vast tracts)
 Groundnut/peanut
 Banana/plantain
 Coconut
 Black Gram
 Millet

References 
"Namaiyur Village Google maps Link"

External links 
 Perambalur District Home Page